Sir Timothy John Le Cocq  (born 1956) is a Jersey lawyer who is the current Bailiff of Jersey. He was sworn in on 17 October 2019.

Early life 

Le Cocq was born in Jersey. He attended Beaulieu Convent School, De La Salle College and Keele University.

Career 

Le Cocq was called to the English Bar in 1981 and to the Jersey Bar in 1985. He became a Crown Advocate in 1996 and was appointed as Her Majesty's Solicitor General on 8 April 2008. He became Attorney General on 10 November 2009, Deputy Bailiff on 2 April 2015 and Bailiff on 17 October 2019.

Le Cocq was knighted in the 2022 Birthday Honours for services to Jersey.

References

External links 

 

1956 births
Living people
Jersey lawyers
Bailiffs of Jersey
Members of the Inner Temple
21st-century King's Counsel
Alumni of Keele University
People educated at De La Salle College, Jersey
Knights Bachelor
Lawyers awarded knighthoods